Salmanabad (also Romanized as Salmānābād; also known as Salmānābād-e Pā’īn) is a village in Jahadabad Rural District, in the Central District of Anbarabad County, Kerman Province, Iran. At the 2006 census, its population was 348, consisting of 69 families.

References 

Populated places in Anbarabad County